Fowlea yunnanensis (common name Yunnan olive keelback) is a species of snake in the family Colubridae. It is found in the Lianghe and Longchuan Counties of southwestern Yunnan, China; its range could extend into Myanmar.

References 

Fowlea
Snakes of China
Endemic fauna of Yunnan
Reptiles described in 1879
Taxa named by John Anderson (zoologist)